Novagen may refer to:

Novagen, a brand of chemicals and biochemicals manufactured by Merck Biosciences subdivision of Merck KGaA
Novagen Software